Cavall Fort is a magazine for children and teenagers published in Catalan every two weeks. It was established in 1961 to foster reading among youths between 9 and 15 years old, following the example of the popular magazine En Patufet, which was discontinued at the end of the 1930s. French style comics (such as those from Hergé) were introduced into the Spanish culture by Cavall Fort.

Awards 
In 1987 the Generalitat of Catalonia awarded Cavall Fort with the Creu de Sant Jordi and in 2011 with the Premi Nacional de Cultura (National Culture Award).

References

External links 
 

1961 establishments in Spain
Biweekly magazines
Magazines published in Catalonia
Catalan-language magazines
Magazines about comics
Magazines established in 1961
Teen magazines
Children's magazines published in Spain